18 Andromedae, abbreviated 18 And, is a single star in the northern constellation of Andromeda. 18 Andromedae is the Flamsteed designation. It is visible to the naked eye with an apparent visual magnitude of 5.350. The annual parallax shift of  can be used to estimate a distance of 413 light years. It is moving further from the Earth with a heliocentric radial velocity of +10 km/s.

This is a B-type main-sequence star with a stellar classification of B9 Ve, where the 'e' notation indicates this is a Be star. The stellar spectrum of 18 And displays an emission line in the hydrogen Brackett series due to a dense gaseous circumstellar envelope. The star is spinning rapidly with a projected rotational velocity of 183 km/s and has about three times the mass of the Sun. It is radiating 147 times the Sun's luminosity from its photosphere at an effective temperature of 10,351 K.

References

B-type main-sequence stars
Be stars
Andromeda (constellation)
Durchmusterung objects
Andromedae, 18
222304
116709
8967